Gross-Basenach or Groß-Basenach is the designation for a series of five so-called M-class German military semi-rigid airships constructed by balloonist Nikolaus Basenach and Major Hans Georg Friedrich Groß (1860–1924) of the Royal Prussian Airship Battalion Nr 2 between 1907 and 1914.

They produced one experimental and four military Groß-Basenach types, rebuilding each one several times. In all they were not as successful as Major Groß wished. He was one of the sharpest critics of the Zeppelin airships, but the overall superiority and popularity of the Zeppelins doomed his own airships. Even his more successful competitors, Parseval and  Schütte-Lanz, could not compete with Zeppelin after the war's end.

Versuchsluftschiff

The Versuchluftschiff (experimental airship) had a volume of 1,800 cubic metres and had a keel directly under the balloon envelope. It was mostly constructed by the firm Siemens-Schuckert GmbH.

The first flight took place at 1907-05-07.

Later the airship was rebuilt, including among other things the empennage.

M I 

5,000 m³ volume
Length 65.5 metres, Diameter 11.1 metre
built by the Luftschiffer-Bataillon in Berlin Tegel
First flight: 30 June 1908
Propulsion: two Körting-engines each 75 HP

On 21 September 1908 it set a flight endurance record of over 13 hours. In 1913 the hull was lengthened to 71.8 metres. In its lengthened state it first flew on 26 March 1913. The keel was changed three times and the volume increased to 5600 m³.

M II

M II was built in 1909 and enlarged in 1911.

M III

M III was built in 1909 and first flew on 31 December 1909
Volume: 7,800 m³
Länge: 81.5 metres
enlarged in 1912 to 9,000 m³ and a length of 83.3 metre
Propulsion: two Körting-engines each 75 HP
Maximum speed: ; after rebuild: 
M III was the fastest airship of its time.

M IV

19,000 cubic metres volume
fitted with a ballonet to regulate the pressure
1913 Rebuilt and equipped with 100-kilogram bombs
1914 enlarged
Propulsion: three Maybach-engines with a total of 
From 28 December 1914 until 3 November 1915 it performed 24 patrols over the Baltic Sea. On 10 September 1915 it attacked a submarine with 100-kilogram bombs.

Notes

References
Luisenstadt 2008. Großstraße in Köpenick (German) last accessed 2008-07-05
Editors of German Wikipedia  (current version)
Pilot und Luftschiff. Halbstarre Luftschiffe vom Typ Groß Basenach (German) last accessed 2008-07-05

Unless otherwise cited, this article was sourced from

Further reading
 Schmitt, G. und Schwipps, W., Pioniere der frühen Luftfahrt,Gondrom Verlag, Blindlach 1995,  (German)
 Basenach, N., Die drei Systeme in: Bröckelmann (Hrsg.), Wir Luftschiffer, Ullstein, Berlin und Wien 1909, pages 240–268. (German)

Airships of Germany
1900s German aircraft
1910s German aircraft
German military aircraft
Aviation in World War I